Mashan may refer to:

China
Mashan County (马山县), Guangxi
Mashan District (麻山区), Jixi, Heilongjiang
Subdistricts (马山街道)
Mashan Subdistrict, Wuxi, in Binhu District, Wuxi, Jiangsu
Mashan Subdistrict, Chaoyang, Liaoning, in Longcheng District
Mashan Subdistrict, Yantai, in Laishan District, Yantai, Shandong

Towns
Mashan, Jiangxi (麻山镇), in Xiangdong District, Pingxiang
Written as "马山镇":
Mashan, Meitan County, Guizhou
Mashan, Hubei, in Jingzhou District, Jingzhou
Mashan, Shandong, in Changqing District, Jinan
Mashan, Zhejiang, in Yuecheng District, Shaoxing

 Townships
 Mashan Township, Heng County (马山乡), Guangxi
 Mashan Township, Liucheng County (马山乡), Guangxi
 Mashan Township, Guizhou (麻山乡), in Wangmo County

Iran
Mashan, Iran, a village in Sistan and Baluchestan Province, Iran

South Korea
Masan (馬山市), former municipality in South Gyeongsang Province, South Korea, merged in July 2010 with Changwon and Jinhae into Changwon City

Taiwan
Mashan Broadcasting and Observation Station, Jinsha (Kinsha), Kinmen (Qumeoy), Taiwan (ROC)

Other
 Mashan Miao, the dialect of the Miao language spoken around Mashan Township, Guizhou